Chromosome 14 open reading frame 102 (accession: AK294958; alias: C14orf102, FLJ14051, FLJ10008, FLJ52106) is a 3810bp protein-encoding gene that is highly conserved among its non-distant orthologs.  It contains 20 introns and 8 different RNAs - 7 splice variants and 1 unspliced form - and is located on the reverse strand of chromosome 14 (14q32.11).  The protein encoded by this gene (accession: BAG58032) belongs to the UPF0614 family of Up-frameshift proteins and has a molecular weight of 132.417 kDa and isoelectric point of 7.88.  It is expected to have a protein binding function and localization in the cytoplasm.

Expression
According to EST profiles, C14orf102 is most highly expressed in the esophagus (98 TPM) and trachea (76), and is further expressed in multiple different tissues.  However, the AceView summary suggests that this gene is expressed most highly in the brain, followed by decreased expression in 81 separate tissues.  This is inferred in the reconstruction of the mRNA sequence, as well as exon sequencing, in that the majority of cDNA clones used for each procedure were found in the brain.  This is consistent with GenBank record, which indicates that the cDNA clone was also isolated from brain tissue.  The general expression of the gene is high, being 1.8 times that of average gene expression.

Protein
The protein contains five HAT (histone acetyltransferase) domains, a coiled coil domain, a domain of unknown function, a lysine-rich region, and a poly-lysine and serine region.  Further post-translational modifications include phosphorylation and mono-methylation sites. Because the protein is considered to be a part of a family of Up-frameshift proteins, it is expected to function in protein binding and to be located in the cytoplasm. Certain UPF proteins have been found to play a central role in the nonsense-mediated mRNA decay (NMD) pathway, which is responsible for identifying and degrading mRNA sequences that contain premature termination codons (PTCs) – sequences that encode truncated amino acid sequences.

Interaction
C14orf102 interacts with RNPS1, a gene encoding a protein that is known to be directly involved in nuclear export and surveillance of mRNA.  Surveillance by the RNPS1 protein initiates NMD after identification of exported, PTC-containing mRNA.  Because UPF0614 is expected to be located in the cytoplasm and function in protein binding, this interaction supports the potential role of UPF0614 in the NMD pathway.

References

Genes